The Kuyper cabinet was the cabinet of the Netherlands from 1 August 1901 until 17 August 1905. The cabinet was formed by the political party Anti-Revolutionary Party (ARP) and Independent Catholics (I) after the election of 1901. The right-wing cabinet was a minority government in the House of Representatives. Abraham Kuyper, the Leader of the Anti-Revolutionary Party was Prime Minister.

Cabinet Members

 Resigned.
 Served ad interim.
 Died in office.

References

External links
Official

  Kabinet-Kuyper Parlement & Politiek

Cabinets of the Netherlands
1901 establishments in the Netherlands
1905 disestablishments in the Netherlands
Cabinets established in 1901
Cabinets disestablished in 1905
Minority governments